Havigannada, also called as Havyaka Bhaashe and Havyaka Kannada, is the dialect of Kannada spoken in Malenadu and coastal region of Karnataka.

Usage 
Havigannada uses similar verbs and words as mainstream Kannada. However, it has more in common with Halegannada (Old Kannada) than other Kannada dialects. This might be the reason why even native Kannadigas of other regions find it difficult to comprehend it for the first time.

It is spoken in the taluks of Thirthahalli, Shivamogga, Sagara, Sirsi, Yellapur, Siddapur, Honnavar, Hosanagara , Bhatkal, etc. where there is a higher density of Havyakas in relation to other places.

In some parts of Uttara Kannada District such as Kumta, Honnavara, Bhatkal, Sirsi, and Siddapur, neuter gender is often used instead of feminine gender.

Havigannada was partly used in Sandalwood films: Bettada Jeeva, Nammoora Mandara Hoove and Naayi Neralu, which was shot in and around Yana.

Examples

Pronouns

Verbs

Interrogative

References

External links
 Oppanna.com : Havyaka / Havigannada Blog portal

Dravidian languages
Kannada language
Havigannada people